Wolfgang Kleff (born 16 November 1946) is a German former professional footballer who played as a goalkeeper.

Club career
Kleff was born in Schwerte, North Rhine-Westphalia. He joined Borussia Mönchengladbach from amateur outfit VfL Schwerte, where he was not a regular starter, in 1968 to become the leading goalkeeper of the Bundesliga side until injuries forced him to lay-off periods in the late 1970s. From 1968 to 1976 he did not miss any domestic game of Borussia Mönchengladbach and was able to lift five Bundesliga titles (1969–70, 1970–71, 1974–75, 1975–76, 1976–77) one DFB-Pokal (1972–73) and one UEFA Cup (1974–75) trophy with Die Fohlen. He was also in the Borussia Mönchengladbach team which lost to Liverpool in the 1972 UEFA Cup Final in and the 1976–77 European Cup. He was also part of the Mönchengladbach team which won the 1978–79 UEFA Cup.

After a season at Hertha BSC, he returned to Mönchengladbach, Kleff played two more years in the Bundesliga for his old club, joining local rival Fortuna Düsseldorf for two years in 1982. After a fall-out with Düsseldorf he joined Rot-Weiß Oberhausen of the 2. Bundesliga and was on the verge of becoming 40 years of age when he enjoyed one more year in the best German division with VfL Bochum. At the age of forty Kleff played the majority of games for promoted FSV Salmrohr in the 1986–87 2. Bundesliga. The season ended in swift relegation for Salmrohr and in Kleff's decision to hang up his gloves. However, for some time he continued to be a goalkeeper for amateurs such as SV Straelen.

At the end of his illustrious career, Kleff had taken part in 433 matches in the Bundesliga and 56 games in the 2. Bundesliga.

International career
Kleff's international career with the West Germany national team was limited due to his competitor Sepp Maier occupying the role of West Germany's leading goalkeeper in that decade. Kleff won six caps for his country in between 1971 and 1974, the first of which took place in Oslo on 22 June 1971, a 7–1 defeat of Norway in a post-season friendly. Kleff won the 1972 UEFA European Championship trophy in Brussels and the 1974 FIFA World Cup.

Post-playing life
Kleff's resemblance to German actor and comedian Otto Waalkes earned him the nickname "Otto" and minor roles in films such as Otto – Der Film (Otto – The Movie) in 1985 and Werner – Beinhart! in 1990.

Honours
Borussia Mönchengladbach

Bundesliga: 1969–70, 1970–71, 1974–75, 1975–76, 1976–77
DFB-Pokal: 1972–73
UEFA Cup: 1974–75, 1978–79

Germany
 UEFA European Championship: 1972
 FIFA World Cup: 1974

References

External links
 
 
 

1946 births
Living people
People from Schwerte
Sportspeople from Arnsberg (region)
German footballers
Association football goalkeepers
Germany international footballers
UEFA Cup winning players
Bundesliga players
2. Bundesliga players
Borussia Mönchengladbach players
Hertha BSC players
Fortuna Düsseldorf players
Rot-Weiß Oberhausen players
VfL Bochum players
FSV Salmrohr players
SV 19 Straelen players
KFC Uerdingen 05 players
UEFA European Championship-winning players
UEFA Euro 1972 players
FIFA World Cup-winning players
1974 FIFA World Cup players
Footballers from North Rhine-Westphalia
German male film actors
West German footballers